Doruma Airport  is an airstrip serving the town of Doruma, Haut-Uélé Province, Democratic Republic of the Congo.

See also

Transport in the Democratic Republic of the Congo
List of airports in the Democratic Republic of the Congo

References

External links
 OpenStreetMap - Doruma Airport
 OurAirports - Doruma
 FallingRain - Doruma Airport
 HERE Maps - Doruma
 

Airports in Haut-Uélé